United States national water polo team may refer to:

 United States men's national water polo team
 United States women's national water polo team